Layton Stewart (born 3 September 2002) is an English professional footballer who plays for Liverpool as a striker.

Career
Stewart was named in the Liverpool first team squad for the first time in December 2019, for an Carabao Cup tie with Aston Villa. Liverpool had named a squad of Academy players due to the first team competing in the 2019 FIFA Club World Cup in Qatar in the same week.

From Huyton, Stewart signed his first professional contract with Liverpool in February 2020. Despite suffering an anterior cruciate injury to his knee the club gave him a new contract in May 2021 as he was undergoing rehabilitation. 

On 9 November 2022, Stewart made his senior debut when he started for
Liverpool in a win against Derby County in the third round of the 2022–23 EFL Cup at Anfield.

Career statistics

References

Living people
2002 births
Sportspeople from Knowsley, Merseyside
Footballers from Liverpool
English footballers
Association football forwards
Liverpool F.C. players